The Orange County National Championship was a golf tournament on the Korn Ferry Tour. The tournament was one of several added to the Korn Ferry Tour schedule in 2020 as part of adjustments due to the COVID-19 pandemic. It was played in October 2020 on the Panther Lake Course at Orange County National Golf Center near Winter Garden, Florida. Trey Mullinax won the tournament by one stroke over Stephan Jäger and Brandon Wu.

Winners

Bolded golfers graduated to the PGA Tour via the Korn Ferry Tour regular-season money list.

References

External links
Coverage on the Korn Ferry Tour's official site

Former Korn Ferry Tour events
Golf in Florida
Recurring sporting events established in 2020
Recurring sporting events disestablished in 2020
2020 establishments in Florida
2020 disestablishments in Florida